A wrist clasp is a mechanism made of a  metal hook and an eye closure, used for closing the wrist opening on a tunic. Wrist clasps are considered to be an important piece of dress accessories for both Vikings and Anglo Saxons.

See also 
 Watch strap

Notes 

Fashion accessories
Fasteners
Wrist
Handwear